Palm Meadows International Baseball Facility is an Australian baseball field located on the Gold Coast, Queensland. It is owned by Hungtat Worldwide Pty Ltd (Trading as Palm Meadows Golf course) and is leased through Gold Coast city council. It is currently home to the Major League Baseball Australian Academy Program (MLBAAP).

The stadium is widely regarded as one of Australia's premium baseball facilities and was used by the gold medal United States national baseball team for their successful pre-Olympic Games training in 2000.
It has also been home to the Gold Coast Clippers and Daikyo Dolphins when they played in the now defunct Australian Baseball League and International Baseball League of Australia. It has also been a training facility for the Australia national baseball team, Canada national baseball team, Queensland Rams and various Korean and Japanese teams as well as being the host of the 2008 Olympic Games Qualification, Senior and Junior Oceanic Championships, Australian Baseball Federation Diamond Awards and several goodwill series as part of the MLBAAP program.

Features
The field features a premium major league standard clay infield with a laser levelled and lush Bermuda grass outfield. The diamond is complemented by television quality floodlighting, grandstand seating to fit 2,500.

Included as part of the facility is two JUGS pitching machines, a full batting cage and hitting screen facilities, a secondary practice diamond, full dressing room amenities and on-site team meeting rooms including a mess room.

See also

 Sports on the Gold Coast, Queensland

References

Baseball venues in Australia
Sports venues on the Gold Coast, Queensland